West Virginia Route 62 is a north–south state highway in western West Virginia. The southern terminus of the route is at West Virginia Route 25 in Dunbar. The northern terminus is at Interstate 77 and U.S. Route 33 in Ripley.

History
In the 1920s, WV 62 was designated West Virginia Route 19.

Up until the late 1960s, WV 62 was designated as U.S. Route 35 from Dunbar to Point Pleasant, crossing the Silver Bridge into Gallipolis, Ohio.  After the Silver Bridge collapsed in 1967 (necessitating the building of a new bridge, the Silver Memorial Bridge—finished in 1969), US 35 was moved to the south bank (replacing the former WV 17) of the Kanawha River and US 35's previous route was designated as WV 62.

In December 2003, WV 62 was extended northward (but geographically southeastward) along then-US 33 from its former northern terminus at US 33 in Mason to Ripley.  Sometimes WV 62 is referred to as "Believe It Or Not Highway" because it actually goes south when it's signed as "north" going toward Ripley from Mason, and vice versa.

Major intersections

West Virginia Route Spur 62
WV Spur 62 connects WV 62 to Ohio State Route 833 via the Pomeroy–Mason Bridge. , Spur 62 is signposted as part of Ohio State Route 833.

References

062
Transportation in Kanawha County, West Virginia
Transportation in Putnam County, West Virginia
Transportation in Mason County, West Virginia
Transportation in Jackson County, West Virginia
Point Pleasant micropolitan area
U.S. Route 35